The 1986–87 Yorkshire Cup was the seventy-ninth occasion on which the  Yorkshire Cup competition was held. This season there were no junior/amateur clubs taking part, and no "leavers", but another new entrant in the form of Mansfield Marksman and so the total of entries increases by one up to eighteen. This in turn resulted in the necessity to increase the number of matches in the preliminary round to reduce the  number of clubs entering the first round to sixteen.

In a repeat of the 1983–84 Yorkshire Cup's final pairing, Castleford turned the  tables, reversing the result and beating Hull F.C. by the score of 31-24 to win the  trophy. The match was played at Headingley, Leeds, now in West Yorkshire. The attendance was 11,132 and receipts were £31,888. This was the fourth time in the incredible eleven-year period in which Castleford. previously only once winners in 1977, will make eight appearances in the Yorkshire Cup final, winning on four and ending as runner-up on four occasions.

Background 
The Rugby League Yorkshire Cup competition was a knock-out competition between (mainly professional) rugby league clubs from  the  county of Yorkshire. The actual area was at times increased to encompass other teams from  outside the  county such as Newcastle, Mansfield, Coventry, and even London (in the form of Acton & Willesden).

The Rugby League season always (until the onset of "Summer Rugby" in 1996) ran from around August-time through to around May-time and this competition always took place early in the season, in the Autumn, with the final taking place in (or just before) December (The only exception to this was when disruption of the fixture list was caused during, and immediately after, the two World Wars)

Competition and results

Preliminary round 
Involved 2 matches and 4 clubs

Round 1 
Involved  8 matches (with no byes) and 16 clubs

Round 2 - Quarter-finals 
Involved 4 matches and 8 clubs

Round 2 - replays  
Involved  1 match and 2 clubs

Round 3 – Semi-finals  
Involved 2 matches and 4 clubs

Final

Teams and scorers 

Scoring - Try = four points - Goal = two points - Drop goal = one point

The road to success 
The  following chart excludes any preliminary round fixtures/results

Notes 
1 * The first Yorkshire Cup match to be played by newly elected to the league Mansfield Marksman

2 * This is the first Yorkshire Cup match played at Sheffield Eagles' Owlerton Stadium

3 * Headingley, Leeds, is the home ground of Leeds RLFC with a capacity of 21,000. The record attendance was  40,175 for a league match between Leeds and Bradford Northern on 21 May 1947.

See also 
1986–87 Rugby Football League season
Rugby league county cups

References

External links
Saints Heritage Society
1896–97 Northern Rugby Football Union season at wigan.rlfans.com 
Hull&Proud Fixtures & Results 1896/1897
Widnes Vikings - One team, one passion Season In Review - 1896-97
The Northern Union at warringtonwolves.org

RFL Yorkshire Cup
Yorkshire Cup